Caroline Elizabeth Chisholm, Baroness Chisholm of Owlpen (born 23 December 1951), is a UK life peeress and member of the House of Lords, where she currently sits as a Crossbencher.

Life
The only daughter of John Wyndham, 6th Baron Leconfield, and Pamela Wyndham, Lady Egremont, her elder brother, Max Egremont, succeeded to the family titles.

The Hon. Carlyn Wyndham married in 1976, Colin Chisholm, son of Archibald Chisholm CBE. They have two sons and one daughter.

She was made a life peer on 16 September 2014 as Baroness Chisholm of Owlpen, of Owlpen in the County of Gloucestershire. She sat in the House of Lords as a Conservative Party peer. She has been a baroness-in-waiting (a type of government whip) from 2015 to 2016, 2017 to 2018, 2019 to 2020, and 2021 to 2022. She was a Lords spokesperson for the Cabinet Office in 2016.

In 2022, she became one of the six ladies appointed as "Queen's companions" to Queen Camilla. At the same time, she resigned the Conservative whip to sit as a Crossbencher.

See also
 Earl of Egremont
 Johnson ministry

References

External links
 Baroness Chisholm of Owlpen – UK Parliament
 Burke's Peerage & Baronetage

1951 births
Living people
Conservative Party (UK) life peers
Crossbench life peers
Life peeresses created by Elizabeth II
Daughters of barons
Chisholm